Sahambano is a town and commune in Madagascar. It belongs to the district of Ihosy, which is a part of Ihorombe Region. The population of the commune was estimated to be approximately 6,000 in the 2001 commune census.

Only primary schooling is available. The majority 85% of the population are farmers, while an additional 14.5% receives their livelihood from raising livestock. The most important crop is rice, while other important products are peanuts, beans, maize and cassava. Services provide employment for 0.5% of the population.

Mineral deposits
At Sahambano there are sapphire and corundum deposits.

References and notes 

Populated places in Ihorombe